Steele is a city in southern Pemiscot County in the Missouri Bootheel of southeastern Missouri, United States. The population was 1,853 at the 2020 census.

History
The Steele post office was in operation from 1896 to 2017. The community has the name of L. L. Steele, an early settler. The community was a point along the St. Louis–San Francisco Railway. In 1912, Steele contained seven general stores, three cotton gins, a sawmill and a gristmill.

Geography
Steele is located in southern Pemiscot County, approximately five miles north of the Missouri-Arkansas state line. The community is on Missouri Route 164 and U.S. Route 61. Interstate 55 passes just to the east of the city. Caruthersville is on the Mississippi River, eleven miles northeast of Steele.

Demographics

2010 census
As of the census of 2010, there were 2,172 people, 838 households, and 551 families living in the city. The racial makeup of the city was 77.53% White, 18.69% Black or African American, 0.46% Native American, 0.37% Asian, 1.38% from other races, and 1.57% from two or more races. Hispanic or Latino of any race were 2.16% of the population.

There were 838 households, of which 38.8% had children under the age of 18 living with them, 40.5% were married couples living together, 19.0% had a female householder with no husband present, 6.3% had a male householder with no wife present, and 34.2% were non-families. 29.4% of all households were made up of individuals, and 13% had someone living alone who was 65 years of age or older. The average household size was 2.54 and the average family size was 3.12.

The median age in the city was 35.4 years. 29.1% of residents were under the age of 18; 9.2% were between the ages of 18 and 24; 23.8% were from 25 to 44; 23% were from 45 to 64; and 14.9% were 65 years of age or older. The gender makeup of the city was 46.6% male and 53.4% female.

2000 census
As of the census of 2000, there were 2,263 people, 887 households, and 582 families living in the city. The population density was 1,205.9 people per square mile (464.8/km). There were 971 housing units at an average density of 517.4 per square mile (199.4/km). The racial makeup of the city was 80.87% White, 17.41% African American, 100% Native American, 0.93% from other races, and 0.75% from two or more races. Hispanic or Latino of any race were 1.81% of the population.

There were 887 households, out of which 31.8% had children under the age of 18 living with them, 43.6% were married couples living together, 17.1% had a female householder with no husband present, and 34.3% were non-families. 30.7% of all households were made up of individuals, and 15.6% had someone living alone who was 65 years of age or older. The average household size was 2.49 and the average family size was 3.11.

In the city, the population was spread out, with 29.7% under the age of 18, 8.8% from 18 to 24, 23.8% from 25 to 44, 21.8% from 45 to 64, and 16.0% who were 65 years of age or older. The median age was 34 years. For every 100 females, there were 84.7 males. For every 100 females age 18 and over, there were 79.0 males.

The median income for a household in the city was $20,958, and the median income for a family was $29,125. Males had a median income of $30,595 versus $19,286 for females. The per capita income for the city was $13,695. About 25.5% of families and 31.3% of the population were below the poverty line, including 39.6% of those under age 18 and 26.0% of those age 65 or over.

Education
South Pemiscot Schools is the local district. It operates these public schools: East Elementary School (Kindergarten), Central Elementary School (grades 1–6), and South Pemiscot High School (grades 7-12).

Steele has a lending library, the Steele Public Library.

References

External links
 Historic maps of Steele in the Sanborn Maps of Missouri Collection at the University of Missouri

Cities in Pemiscot County, Missouri
Cities in Missouri